Ö is a locality situated in Ånge Municipality, Västernorrland County, Sweden with 90 inhabitants in 2015.

See also
List of short place names

References 

Populated places in Ånge Municipality
Medelpad